Ladachi Mi Lek Ga! is an Indian Marathi series that airs on Zee Marathi. It is produced by Vishal Gupta under the banner of Aar Entertainment Enterprises.

Synopsis 
The show is mixture of romance and hatred. Kasturi, a nurse hails from a humble background, gets married to Saurabh, a doctor. Their happy marriage is calm before the storm as Kasturi fails to realize that Saurabh's mother is waiting to pounce her.

Cast

Main 
 Mitali Mayekar as Kasturi Hanumant Lokhande / Kasturi Saurabh Satam
 Aroh Welankar as Saurabh Pratap Satam

Recurring 
Kasturi's family
 Umesh Jagtap as Hanumant Lokhande (Kasturi's father)
 Rohan Surve as Vijay Hanumant Lokhande (Kasturi's brother)
 Rajashri Nikam as Lakshmi Hanumant Lokhande (Kasturi's mother)

Saurabh's family
 Smita Tambe as Kamini Pratap Satam (Saurabh's mother / Mummy)
 Vandana Marathe as Saurabh's grandmother
 Ramesh Rokade as Pratap Satam (Saurabh's father / Bhai)
 Anupama Takmoghe as Kala (Bhai's sister)

Others
 Milind Pemgirikar as Shiva (Mummy's right hand)
 Akansha Gade as Sindhu (Saurabh's friend)
 Sonal Pawar as Prajakta (Vijay's girlfriend)
 Vedangi Kulkarni as Vini (Kasturi's friend)

Production 
The series premiered on 14 September 2020 and aired on Zee Marathi from Monday to Saturday at 7 pm by replacing Mrs. Mukhyamantri.

Airing history

References

External links 
Ladachi Mi Lek Ga! at ZEE5
 

Marathi-language television shows
2020 Indian television series debuts
Zee Marathi original programming
2021 Indian television series endings